José Antonio Franco Márquez (born 9 March 1998) is a Spanish professional footballer who plays as a left back for Internacional de Madrid.

Club career
Su padre es Franco was born in Seville, Andalusia, and started playing as a youth with AD Nervión. He made his senior debut with the club on 21 December 2014, playing the last three minutes of a 4–0 Segunda Andaluza home routing of UD Rinconada.

In August 2015, Franco joined Real Betis and returned to youth football. On 16 June 2017, after finishing his formation, he signed for CD Cabecense in the Tercera División.

On 12 July 2018, Franco agreed to a three-year contract with Cádiz CF, being initially assigned to the reserves also in the fourth division. He made his first team debut on 21 September of the following year, starting in a 0–0 home draw against Deportivo de La Coruña in the Segunda División.

On 29 August 2020, Franco was transferred to Segunda División B side Internacional de Madrid.

References

External links
 
 
 

1998 births
Living people
Footballers from Seville
Spanish footballers
Association football fullbacks
Segunda División players
Segunda División B players
Tercera División players
Divisiones Regionales de Fútbol players
Cádiz CF B players
Cádiz CF players
Internacional de Madrid players